Deeds, Not Words is an album by American jazz drummer Max Roach featuring tracks recorded in 1958 and released on the Riverside label.

Reception

Allmusic awarded the album 4½ stars, stating: "This is fine music from a group that was trying to stretch themselves beyond hard bop".

Track listing
 "You Stepped Out of a Dream"  (Nacio Herb Brown, Gus Kahn) - 7:46     
 "Filidé" (Ray Draper) - 7:06     
 "It's You or No One"  (Sammy Cahn, Jule Styne) - 4:14     
 "Jodie's Cha-Cha" (Bill Lee) - 4:56     
 "Deeds, Not Words" (Lee) - 4:34     
 "Larry-Larue"  (Booker Little) - 5:13     
 "Conversation"  (Max Roach) - 3:48     
 "There Will Never Be Another You"  (Mack Gordon, Harry Warren) - 5:50
Track 8 with Oscar Pettiford is a CD bonus track recorded at the sessions for Sonny Rollins' Freedom Suite

Personnel 
Max Roach - drums
Booker Little - trumpet (tracks: 1 to 6)
Ray Draper - tuba (tracks: 1 to 6)
George Coleman  - tenor saxophone (tracks: 1 to 6)
Art Davis - bass (tracks: 1 to 6)
Oscar Pettiford - bass (track: 8)

References 

1958 albums
Max Roach albums
Albums produced by Orrin Keepnews
Riverside Records albums